William Archer House is a historic home located at Brownville in Jefferson County, New York.  It is a stone house built about 1811.

It was listed on the National Register of Historic Places in 1980.

References

Houses on the National Register of Historic Places in New York (state)
Houses in Jefferson County, New York
National Register of Historic Places in Jefferson County, New York